Davide Pedersoli & C. is an Italian firearms manufacturing company based in Gardone Val Trompia, Italy, that was founded in 1957 by Davide Pedersoli.

Davide Pedersoli specializes in CNC-engineered black-powder weapon replicas for hunting, marksmanship and reenactment. Its weapons normally are more expensive than its competitors, but have a reputation for precision and reliability.

In 2014, Davide Pedersoli went into partnership with three other Italian manufacturers (F.A.I.R, Sabatti, and a division of Tanfoglio called FT Italia) in order to better serve the United States firearms market. Italian Firearms Group, located in Amarillo, Texas, is the import, sales, marketing, and service hub for those companies in the United States.

Models
Pedersoli is one of the more prolific manufacturers of Sharps rifles and carbines. The company also manufactures replicas of duelling pistols and Harper's Ferry pistols.

See also 
 Chiappa Firearms
 A. Uberti, Srl.

References

External links
 Davide Pedersoli official page

Firearm manufacturers of Italy
Muzzleloading
Historical reenactment
Manufacturing companies established in 1957
Italian companies established in 1957
Italian brands